Roger Beyer is a Republican politician from the US state of Oregon, who most recently served in the Oregon State Senate, representing District 9, which includes parts of Clackamas, Linn, and Marion County, Oregon counties.

Early life and career
Beyer grew up in Molalla, Oregon and graduated from Molalla Union High School. He earned a bachelor of science degree in horticulture from Oregon State University, and operated a Christmas tree farm in Molalla.

Political career
In 1996, Beyer was elected to the Oregon House of Representatives representing District 28 in southern Clackamas County. He was re-elected to the seat in 1998. In 2000, he won election to a vacant Oregon Senate seat. He served as Senate minority leader for the 2003 session, and was easily re-elected to a second term in 2004.

In January 2007, Beyer resigned from the Senate to become executive secretary for the Oregon Seed Council, an organization which lobbies on behalf of Oregon's grass seed growers.

References

External links
Oregon Seed Council website

Living people
Republican Party Oregon state senators
Republican Party members of the Oregon House of Representatives
People from Molalla, Oregon
Oregon State University alumni
American lobbyists
21st-century American politicians
Year of birth missing (living people)